The Asaṭīr (al-Asāṭīr), also known as the Samaritan Book of the Secrets of Moses, is a collection of Samaritan Biblical legends, parallel to the Jewish Midrash, and which draws heavily upon oral traditions known among Jews in the 2nd and 3rd centuries CE. Moses Gaster places its compilation about the middle or end of the third century BCE, and rendered a translation of the work in 1927 with the Royal Asiatic Society in London. Others have said that its language style resembles more the Arabic language used by the scholar Ab Ḥisda [Isda] of Tyre (Abū'l-Ḥasan aṣ-Ṣūrī) in his poems of the eleventh century CE, and place its composition in the second-half of the tenth-century. The book's title, Asatir (or Astir), was thought by Gaster to mean "secrets," from which name, he applied to the book its newer title, "The Secrets of Moses." Even so, such an interpretation has nothing to do with the contents of the book, nor with its subject. A more precise translation of the Arabic title of the work, al-Asāṭīr, would be "legends" or "tales," as in the Koranic expression asāṭīr al-Awwalīn ("the Legends of the Ancients"). 

The book is written in the form of a chronicle, its narrative covering the whole of the Pentateuch, starting with Adam, the first man, and concluding with the death of Moses, adding thereto anecdotal material not available in the Hebrew Bible. It deals mainly with the succession of personages from Adam to Moses, some 26 generations. The whole book is written around the story of their lives, as handed down by oral traditions. The book ascribes 2,800 years from the first man, Adam, to Israel's victory over the Midianites.  

The book, preserved by the Samaritan community of Nablus, compiled on parchment in late Samaritan Aramaic mixed with an antiquated Arabic vernacular, and divided into twelve chapters, was discovered by Gaster in 1907. Its antiquity is attested to by the fact that it was written when the vestiges of a "peculiar Samaritan Hebrew-Aramaic" was still in practice, and Arabic had only begun to supersede it. Since there is no evidence that Moses actually conveyed the oral traditions contained therein, various Samaritan writers merely refer to its author as "the Master of the Asatir," or the "Author of the Asatir" (Baal Asatir), leaving it undecided as to whether Moses had actually conveyed its legends. The book is therefore largely ascribed as being pseudepigraphic. The account tells of the Pharaoh at the time of Moses being from the progeny of Japheth, rather than of Ham. The Pharaoh at the time of Joseph, the same account says, was from the progeny of Ishmael.

Literary style and content
The epithet used to describe Nimrod in Genesis 10:8, namely, Gibbor, is rendered by the author of The Asatir as "giant," rather than "mighty one." According to The Asatir, there were several kings, one in succession after the other, whose names were Nimrod. Seth is said to have built the city of Antokia (Antioch), one of the cities inhabited before the Great Deluge, while Noah, after the Great Deluge, is said to have been buried in the Tomb of the Patriarchs in Hebron, along with Adam, the first man. The alleged burial-place of Adam mirrors that of Jewish tradition. 

Although in today's Modern Age it is near futile to trace the migration patterns of Noah's progeny because of mass-migrations of peoples, The Asatir describes the descendants of two of the sons of Shem, viz. Laud (Ld) and Aram, as having settled in a region of Afghanistan formerly known as Khorasan (Charassan), but known by the Arabic-speaking peoples of Afrikia (North Africa) as simply "the isle" (Arabic: Al-gezirah). Elam and Ashur are said to have settled in places north of Ur of the Chaldees. 

The first half of the 11th chapter contains a description of the borders of the Land of Israel, in which some of the place names mentioned are no longer identifiable. Some suggest that the author's familiarity with the geography of northern Erez Israel and Syria leads to the conclusion that he may have lived in this region, where large Samaritan communities then flourished in Acre, Tyre, and Damascus.

Traditions parallel with Jewish tradition
While the author of The Asatir and Jewish traditions are in general agreement, there are differences in minor details. For example, according to Seder Olam Rabba, there were 340 years from the Great Deluge in the time of Noah (dated at 1656 anno mundi) to the Division of the earth (dated at 1996 anno mundi) when his sons were sent into their respective countries at the confounding of the languages, only ten years before the death of Noah, when he was aged 940. The Samaritan tradition, as conveyed by The Asatir, avers differently, that Noah divided the earth among his three sons and their descendants some twenty years before his death, when he was aged 930.

Translations of work
Today, there exists an English translation of the work, made by Moses Gaster. A partial Hebrew translation was later published by Z. Ben-Ḥayyim, in 'The Book of Asatir', Tarbiẕ 14 (1943), 104–252, 174–190; Tarbiẕ 15 (1944), 71–87. An Arabic translation was also made of the text, as also a Samaritan modern Hebrew translation, called Pitron. An English translation of the Samaritan modern Hebrew translation, Pitron, was made by Gaster.

The Asatir is often cited by 17th and 18th-century Arabic authors,  Muslim al-Danār and Ibrahim al-Ayya, in their Bible commentaries.

See also
 Samaritan Chronicle
 Chronicles of Jerahmeel
 Tolidah
 Samaritan Pentateuch

Further reading
 John Macdonald, Theology of the Samaritans, London 1964, p. 44

References

External links 
 The Asatir: The Samaritan Book of the “Secrets of Moses”

Old Testament pseudepigrapha
Middle Eastern chronicles
Samaritan texts
Oral tradition
Traditional stories
Samaritan culture and history